Huntingwood is a predominantly industrial suburb in the City of Blacktown, in Western Sydney, in the state of New South Wales, Australia.

Name
The composite name was chosen because the first English-style hunting is said to have taken place here and the 'Woods Estate', owned by the Woods family for nearly a century, is located within the suburb.

Transport
The M4 and Westlink M7 motorways run through the adjacent suburbs. Given this easy access to main Sydney's main arterial road network, companies such as Coles Myer and Woolworths Limited have transport and logistics complexes situated off Great Western Highway the between the Wallgrove Road and Reservoir Road exists from the M4.

Manufacturing
In 2014, a decision by Diageo to relocate the bottling operations of Queensland's Bundaberg Rum, to the western Sydney suburb of Huntingwood resulted in local job losses in the city that bears its name.

References

External links 
The 2001 City of Blacktown Social Plan

Suburbs of Sydney
City of Blacktown